The 2016 Vietnamese National Football Third League was the 12th season of the Vietnamese National Football Third League. The season began on 12 November 2016 and finished on 18 November 2016.

Rule 
In this season, there are 4 teams competing for 2 promotion slot to Second League. The teams play each other once in a centralised venue.

Team changes 
The following teams have changed division since the 2015 season.

To Vietnamese Third League 
Relegated from Vietnamese Second League
 Kon Tum

From Vietnamese Third League 
Promoted to Vietnamese Second League
 Hà Nội T&T B
 Viettel B
 An Giang
 PVF

League table 

All matches played in Hà Nội.

Matches

Matchday 1

Matchday 2

Matchday 3

See also  
 2016 V.League 1
 2016 V.League 2
 2016 Vietnamese National Football Second League

References 

2016 in Vietnamese football